NoiseTracker is a freeware tracker created in 1989 for the Amiga platform. It was based on the Ultimate Soundtracker and developed by Pex "Mahoney" Tufvesson and Anders “Kaktus” Berkeman.  It was used by Amiga game musicians to create music with four channels of sampled stereo sound. Additionally it was used by some music groups as a low cost alternative to a full studio for rudimentary backtrack music production. One of the users is Axwell of Swedish House Mafia.

See also

 List of audio trackers

References

External links 
 Noisetracker Webpage, page by author Pex Tufvesson

Freeware
Amiga software
Audio trackers